Lemyra venosa is a moth of the family Erebidae first described by Frederic Moore in 1879. It is found in India in Sikkim and the Khasia Hills and in Bhutan.

References

Moths described in 1879
venosa